Avellan is a surname. Notable people with the surname include:

David Avellan, American professional mixed martial artist
Electra and Elise Avellan, twin sisters and Venezuelan actresses
Elizabeth Avellan (born 1960), American film producer born in Caracas, Venezuela
Enrique Avellán Ferrés (1904–1984), Ecuadorian novelist
Henrik Avellan (1902–1991), Finnish pentathlete
Teodor Avellan aka Fyodor Avelan (1839–1916), Finnish-born Russian admiral
Viivi Avellan (born 1977), Finnish journalist and television hosting entrepreneur